Louie Mar Gangcuangco is a Filipino physician, HIV researcher and novelist. He is the author of the novel Orosa-Nakpil, Malate and is working as Assistant Professor of Medicine for the Hawaii Center for AIDS-University of Hawai'i at Manoa.

Early life and education
Gangcuangco was born on March 26, 1987 in Mandaluyong, Philippines. He finished his primary education in Montessori de San Juan (MSJ) in 1999. He graduated from Manila Science High School (Masci) in 2003.

Gangcuangco was two years accelerated in college under the Integrated Liberal Arts and Medicine (Intarmed) curriculum of the UP College of Medicine at the University of the Philippines Manila. He had his elective clerkship in Infectious Diseases at the David Geffen School of Medicine in UCLA. He trained under the Straight Internal Medicine Internship program of the Philippine General Hospital from June 2009 to April 2010. Gangcuangco received his BS in Basic Medical Sciences degree in 2007 and Doctor of Medicine degree from the UP College of Medicine in May 2010. He has a master's degree in Biomedical Sciences (Tropical Medicine) from the University of Hawaiʻi at Mānoa. He also has a second master's degree in Clinical Trials from the London School of Hygiene and Tropical Medicine.

Published books
Gangcuangco's interests in infectious diseases inspired him at 18 years old, to write the novel, Orosa-Nakpil, Malate, which was published in March 2006. It is an anthropologic exposition of the mechanics of HIV transmission in the Philippine's gay district of Malate, Manila.

Orosa-Nakpil is critically acclaimed for promoting HIV and AIDS awareness. It was featured in the talk show Sharon in June 2006, in an episode aired internationally through The Filipino Channel. In August 2006, Gangcuangco was awarded the Y Idol Award (Youth Idol Award) by Studio 23’s Y Speak. Later that month, the Sentro ng Wikang Filipino conferred a Sertipiko ng Pagpapahalaga for Orosa-Nakpil, Malate.

Orosa-Nakpil, Malate became a National Book Store Best Seller in April 2007. It has been featured in several publications, including the Generation Pink Magazine’s The Great Escape Issue; The Flame: The Official Liberal Journal of the Humanities of the University of Santo Tomas; Icon Magazine’s Career Issue; The Manila Collegian, The Nightmare Before Christmas Issue; and The Philippine Star’s My Favorite Book, Sunday Lifestyle.

In 2008, Gangcuangco published his second book, Gee, My Grades Are Terrific: A Student’s Guide to Academic Excellence, a self-help book for students. The English version of Orosa-Nakpil, Malate was released in September 2009 and the second edition of Gee My Grades Are Terrific was published in August 2011. Gangcuangco is considered by Pinoy Panitikan as one of the most influential authors of the Philippines.

HIV research
In 2010, Gangcuangco headed one of the largest HIV testing projects among men having sex with men in Metro Manila. The findings were presented at the XVIII International AIDS Conference in Vienna, Austria and was published at the Southeast Asian Journal of Tropical Medicine and Public Health. The study entitled, "Prevalence and risk factors for HIV infection among men having sex with men in Metro Manila, Philippines," stirred national debate and attracted media attention because of the high HIV infection rate found among the participants.

In December 2011, Gangcuangco left his positions as faculty member of the San Beda College of Medicine (San Beda University) and the Ateneo School of Medicine and Public Health (Ateneo de Manila University) to pursue HIV research fellowship at the Nagasaki Institute of Tropical Medicine. He currently serves as Assistant Professor of Medicine at the Hawaii Center for AIDS. His research projects are focused on the cardio-metabolic complications of HIV and aging, neuro-cognitive dysfunction, and inflammation.

References

External links
 Official website

Filipino novelists
Tagalog-language writers
1987 births
Living people
People from Mandaluyong
Writers from Metro Manila
University of the Philippines Manila alumni
Academic staff of Ateneo de Manila University